The Elecom Kobe Finies are an American football team located in the Kobe, Japan.  They are a member of the X-League.

Similar to how fellow X-League member Nojima Sagamihara Rise's visual identity is inspired by that of the NFL's Denver Broncos, Elecom Kobe Finies' visual identity is inspired in turn by the Dallas Cowboys - primarily in respect to its colors, logo and helmets, while the layout of the Finies' game jerseys is similar to that of the Seattle Seahawks.

Team history
1975 Team Founded. First named Kohaku Finies.
1976 Team promoted from X2 to X1.
1986 Team named changed to Sunstar Finies.
1991 Advanced to the Tokyo Super Bowl Lost to Onward Oaks 49-10.
1993 Advanced to the Tokyo Super Bowl for the 2nd time. Lost to Asahi Beer Silver Star 13-0.
1996 Advanced to the Semifinals. Lost to the Onward Oaks 21-7.
1999 Sunstar ends sponsorship with the Finies. Team name reverts to the Kohaku Finies.
2005 Team named changed to SRC Kobe Finies.
2009 Sponsorship agreement signed with Elecom Co.,Ltd. Team named changed to Elecom Kobe Finies.

Seasons
{| class="wikitable"
|bgcolor="#FFCCCC"|X-League Champions (1987–present)
|bgcolor="#DDFFDD"|<small>Division Champions</small>
|bgcolor="#D0E7FF"|Final Stage/Semifinals Berth
|bgcolor="#96CDCD"|Wild Card /2nd Stage Berth
|}

Current import playersFormer Import Players'''

References

External links
  (Japanese)

American football in Japan
1978 establishments in Japan
American football teams established in 1978
X-League teams